Norbeck is an unincorporated community in Faulk County, South Dakota, United States.

History
A post office called Norbeck was established in 1920, and remained in operation until 1971. The community has the name of Peter Norbeck, ninth Governor of South Dakota.

References

Unincorporated communities in Faulk County, South Dakota
Unincorporated communities in South Dakota